This is a list of association football clubs in Japan from the 2023 season.

Japan Professional Football League (J.League)

J1 League 

First division of the Japanese professional football system. It has 18 clubs:

 Albirex Niigata
 Avispa Fukuoka
 Cerezo Osaka
 Gamba Osaka
 Hokkaido Consadole Sapporo
 Kashima Antlers
 Kashiwa Reysol
 Kawasaki Frontale
 Kyoto Sanga
 Nagoya Grampus
 Sagan Tosu
 Sanfrecce Hiroshima
 Shonan Bellmare
 FC Tokyo
 Urawa Red Diamonds
 Vissel Kobe
 Yokohama FC
 Yokohama F. Marinos

J2 League 

Second division of the Japanese professional football system. It has 22 clubs:

 Blaublitz Akita
 Fagiano Okayama
 Fujieda MYFC
 Iwaki FC
 JEF United Chiba
 Jubilo Iwata
 Machida Zelvia
 Mito HollyHock
 Montedio Yamagata
 Oita Trinita
 Omiya Ardija
 Renofa Yamaguchi
 Roasso Kumamoto
 Shimizu S-Pulse
 Thespakusatsu Gunma
 Tochigi SC
 Tokushima Vortis
 Tokyo Verdy
 V-Varen Nagasaki
 Vegalta Sendai
 Ventforet Kofu
 Zweigen Kanazawa

J3 League 

Third and last division of the Japanese professional football system. It has 20 clubs:

 Azul Claro Numazu
 Ehime FC
 Fukushima United
 Gainare Tottori
 FC Gifu
 Giravanz Kitakyushu
 FC Imabari
 Iwate Grulla Morioka
 Kagoshima United
 Kamatamare Sanuki
 Kataller Toyama
 Matsumoto Yamaga
 Nagano Parceiro
 Nara Club
 FC Osaka
 FC Ryukyu
 SC Sagamihara
 Tegevajaro Miyazaki
 Vanraure Hachinohe
 Yokohama Sports & Culture Club

Japan Football League (JFL) 

First division of the Japanese amateur football system, and the only nation-wide division for amateur clubs, from where are located some teams aiming to be promoted to the J.League in the near future through associate membership system. Such teams are indicated with (A) in parentheses.

15 clubs:

 Briobecca Urayasu 
 Criacao Shinjuku (A)
 Honda FC*
 Kochi United (A)
 Maruyasu Okazaki*
 Minebea Mitsumi FC* (renamed from Honda Lock SC)
 Okinawa SV (A)
 Reilac Shiga (renamed from MIO Biwako Shiga)
 ReinMeer Aomori (A)
 Sony Sendai*
 Suzuka Point Getters
 Tiamo Hirakata
 Tokyo Musashino United
 Veertien Mie (A)
 Verspah Oita (A)

Japanese Regional Leagues 

It are a group of nine parallel association football leagues in Japan that are organized on the regional basis. They form the fifth and sixth tier of the Japanese association football league system.

 Hokkaidō League 

 Asahikawa FC (Muroran, Hokkaido)
 BTOP Hokkaido (Kuriyama, Hokkaido) (renamed from BTOP Thank Kuriyama)
 Hokkaido Tokachi Sky Earth (Obihiro, Hokkaido)
 Hokushukai Iwamizawa (Iwamizawa, Hokkaido)
 Nippon Express FC (Tomakomai, Hokkaido)
 Norbritz Hokkaido (Sapporo, Hokkaido)
 Sapporo FC (Sapporo, Hokkaido)
 Sapporo Univ. Goal Plunderers (Sapporo, Hokkaido)  (Un)

 Tōhoku League 

 Division 1
 Blancdieu Hirosaki (Hirosaki, Aomori)
 Cobaltore Onagawa (Onagawa, Miyagi)
 Fuji Club 2003 (Hanamaki, Iwate)  (Un)
 Ganju Iwate (Hachimantai, Iwate)
 Morioka Zebra (Morioka, Iwate)
 Nippon Steel Kamaishi* (Kamaishi, Iwate)
 Oshu United (Oshu, Iwate)
 Shichigahama SC (Shichigahama, Miyagi)
 FC Sendai University (Shibata, Miyagi) (Un)
 FC La Universidad de Sendai (Shibata, Miyagi) (Un)

 Division 2 
 North 
 Akita Cambiare (Akita, Akita)
 Bogolle D. Tsugaru (Tsugaru, Aomori)
 Hokuto Bank* (Akita, Akita)
 Lascivo Aomori (Aomori Prefecture)
 Kuzumaki Club (Kuzumaki, Iwate)
 NewPearl Hiraizumi Maesawa (Hiraizumi, Iwate)
 Omiya SC (Ōmiya-ku, Saitama)
 Saruta Kōgyō* (Akita, Akita)
 Shichinohe SC (Shichinohe, Aomori)
 TDK Shinwakai (Nikaho, Akita)

 South 
 Ardore Kuwahara (Miyagi Prefecture)
 Iwaki Furukawa (Iwaki, Fukushima)
 Merry (Fukushima, Fukushima)
 Nagai Club (Nagai, Yamagata)
 Oyama Club (Morioka, Iwate)
 Parafrente Yonezawa (Yonezawa, Yamagata)
 FC Primeiro (Fukushima prefecture)
 Ricoh Industry Tohoku* (Shibata, Miyagi)
 Sendai Sasuke (Sendai, Miyagi)
 Sendai Universität (Sendai, Miyagi) (Un)

 Kantō Soccer League (KSL) 

 Division 1 
 Joyful Honda Tsukuba* (Tsukuba, Ibaraki)
 Nankatsu SC (Katsushika, Tokyo)
 RKU Dragons (Un)
 Tochigi City (Tochigi, Tochigi)
 Toho Titanium (Kanagawa Prefecture)
 Toin University of Yokohama FC (Yokohama, Kanagawa)  (Un)
 Tokyo 23 (Special wards of Tokyo)
 Tokyo International University (Sakado, Saitama) (Un)
 Tokyo United (Bunkyō, Tokyo)
 Vonds Ichihara (Ichihara, Chiba)

 Division 2 
 Aries Tokyo (Tokyo)
 Atsugi Hayabusa (Atsugi, Kanagawa) (Renamed from Hayabusa Eleven)
 Aventura Kawaguchi (Kawaguchi, Saitama)
 Esperanza SC (Yokohama, Kanagawa)
 Hitachi Building System SC* (Chiyoda, Tokyo)
 Identy Mirai (Tsukubamirai, Ibaraki)
 Sakai Trinitas (Sakai, Ibaraki)
 Vertfee Yaita (Yaita, Tochigi)
 Tonan Maebashi (Maebashi, Gunma) (A)
 Yokohama Takeru (Yokohama, Kanagawa)

 Hokushin'etsu League (HFL) 

 Division 1 
 '05 Kamo FC (Kamo, Niigata) (Un)
 Antelope Shiojiri (Shiojiri, Nagano)
 Artista Asama (Tōmi, Nagano)
 Fukui United (Fukui, Fukui)
 FC Hokuriku (Kanazawa, Ishikawa) (Un)
 JSC FC (Seirō, Niigata) (aka. College of Upward Players in Soccer or CUPS)
 Niigata UHW FC (Niigata, Niigata) (Un)
 Toyama Shinjo Club (Toyama, Toyama)

 Division 2 
 Azalea Iida (Iida, Nagano)
 CUPS Seirō (Seirō, Niigata) (Japan Soccer College "B" team)
 AS Jamineiro (Niigata, Niigata)
 Libertas Chikuma (Chikuma, Nagano)
 FC Matsucelona (Matsumoto, Nagano) (Un)
 N-Style Toyama (Toyama)
 Sakai Phoenix (Sakai, Fukui)
 SR Komatsu (Komatsu, Ishikawa)

 Tōkai League 

 Division 1
 Chukyo University FC (Toyota, Aichi) (Un)
 Fujieda City Hall (Fujieda, Shizuoka)
 FC Gifu Second (Gifu, Gifu) (FC Gifu "B" team)
 FC Ise-Shima (Shima, Mie)
 FC Kariya (Kariya, Aichi)
 Tokai Gakuen FC (Nagoya, Aichi) (Un)
 Wyvern FC (Kariya, Aichi)
 Yazaki Valente (Shimada, Shizuoka)

 Division 2 
 Bonbonera Gifu (Chūnō, Gifu)
 Chukyo Univ. FC (Toyota, Aichi) (Un)
 Gakunan F. Mosuperio (Gakunan, Shizuoka)
 AS Kariya (Kariya, Aichi)
 Nagara Club (Gifu, Gifu)
 Nagoya SC (Nagoya, Aichi)
 Sports & Society Izu (Izu, Shizuoka)
 Tokoha University Hamamatsu Campus SC (Hamamatsu, Shizuoka) (Un)
 Toyota Shūkyūdan (Toyota, Aichi)

 Kansai League 

 Division 1 
 Arterivo Wakayama (Wakayama, Wakayama)
 FC Asuka (Kashihara, Nara)
 Basara Hyōgo (Akashi, Hyōgo) (renamed from FC Easy 02 Akashi)
 Cento Cuore Harima (Harima, Hyōgo)
 Kandai FC 2008 (Suita, Osaka) (Un)
 Lagend Shiga (Moriyama, Shiga)
 Moriyama Samurai 2000 (Moriyama, Shiga)
 Ococias Kyoto (Kyoto, Kyoto)

 Division 2 
 FC AWJ (Awaji, Hyōgo) (renamed from FC Awajishima)
 Hannan University Club (Matsubara, Osaka) (Un)
 Hannan University Revolution (Matsubara, Osaka) (Un)
 Kobe FC 1970 (Kobe)
 Kyoto Shiko Club (Kyoto, Kyoto)
 Laranja Kyoto (Kyoto, Kyoto)
 St. Andrew's FC (Izumi, Osaka) (Un)
 Takasago Mineiro (Takasago, Hyōgo)

 Chūgoku League 

 Baleine Shimonoseki (Shimonoseki, Yamaguchi)
 Belugarosso Iwami (Hamada, Shimane) (renamed from Belugarosso Hamada)
 Fukuyama City FC (Fukuyama, Hiroshima)
 Hatsukaichi FC (Hatsukaichi, Hiroshima)
 International Pacific University FC (Okayama, Okayama) (Un)
 Mitsubishi Motors Mizushima* (Kurashiki, Okayama)
 NTN Okayama* (Bizen, Okayama)
 SRC Hiroshima (Hiroshima, Hiroshima)
 Vajra Okayama (Okayama, Okayama)
 Yonago Genki SC (Yonago, Tottori)

 Shikoku League 

 KUFC Nankoku (Nankoku, Kōchi) (Un)
 Llamas Kochi (Kōchi, Kōchi)
 Lvnirosso NC (Niihama, Ehime)
 Nakamura Club (Shimanto, Kōchi)
 FC R.S.G (Kōchi, Kōchi)
 R. Velho Takamatsu (Takamatsu, Kagawa)
 Tadotsu FC (Tadotsu, Kagawa)
 FC Tokushima (Tokushima, Tokushima)

 Kyūshū League (Kyu-League) 

 Brew Kashima (Kashima, Saga)
 Kajiki FC (Kajiki, Kagoshima)
 Kawasoe Club (Saga, Saga)
 KMG Holdings FC* (Fukuoka, Fukuoka)
 Kyushu Sogo Sports College FC (Usa, Ōita)
 J-Lease FC (Ōita)
 NIFS Kanoya FC (Kanoya, Kagoshima) (Un)
 Nippon Steel Oita SC (Ōita, Ōita)
 Nobeoka Agata (Nobeoka, Miyazaki)
 Veroskronos Tsuno (Tsuno, Miyazaki)

Notes
 Teams with * are company teams.
 Teams with "Un"'' are feeder (or "B") teams for their universities' main football teams.
 In the Regional Leagues, First divisions equals to Japanese fifth tier of league football, while 2nd divisions equals to the sixth tier. So, regional leagues who only have one single division, such as Shikoku, have teams going straight from the seventh to the fifth tier in case of a promotion.

See also
 Japanese association football league system
 List of women's football clubs in Japan

Football clubs in Japan
Japan
clubs
Football